John Bowers (born 18 May 1996) is an English cricketer. He made his first-class debut on 7 April 2018 for Cambridge MCCU against Essex as part of the Marylebone Cricket Club University fixtures.

References

External links
 

1996 births
Living people
English cricketers
Cambridge MCCU cricketers